Pickles may refer to:

Dogs
 Pickles (dog) (died 1967), a dog that found the stolen World Cup trophy in 1966
 Pickles (pickleball), a dog often cited as the name origin for the sport of pickleball
 Mr. Pickles, the titular demonic dog in an American animated sitcom

Food
 Pickles, a name for a pickled cucumber in the United States and Canada
 Pickle, a sweet, vinegary pickled chutney popular in Britain, such as Branston Pickle, also known as "sweet pickle" or "ploughman's pickle"
 South Asian pickles, also known as achar, any of several savory condiments popular in South Asia
 Any food that has undergone pickling

Fictional characters
 Pickles (Dethklok), a drummer of Dethklok in Metalocalypse
 The Pickles, a family in Cloudstreet
 Pickles, a character from The Dick Van Dyke Show
 Pickles, a toy bunny from Doc McStuffins
 Pickles B.L.T, a character from the Lalaloopsy toy line
 Pickles Oblong, a character from The Oblongs

People
 Pickles (surname)
 Pickles Dillhoefer (1893–1922), American Major League Baseball catcher
 Pickles Douglas (1886–1954), English cricketer and boxing referee
 Marc-Édouard Vlasic or Pickles (born 1987), defenseman for the San Jose Sharks

Places
 Pickles Creek, a stream in South Dakota
 Pickles Reef, a coral reef in Florida

Other uses
 "Pickles", a SpongeBob SquarePants season 1 episode
 Pickles (comic strip), a comic strip by Brian Crane

See also
 Pickle (disambiguation)
 
 

Lists of people by nickname